14832 Alechinsky, provisional designation , is a Vestian asteroid from the inner regions of the asteroid belt, approximately  in diameter. It was discovered on 27 August 1987, by Belgian astronomer Eric Elst at ESO's La Silla Observatory site in northern Chile. The highly elongated asteroid has a rotation period of 8.1 hours. It was named after Belgian painter Pierre Alechinsky.

Orbit and classification 

Alechinsky is a member of the Vesta family. Vestian asteroids have a composition akin to cumulate eucrites (HED meteorites) and are thought to have originated deep within 4 Vesta's crust, possibly from the Rheasilvia crater, a large impact crater on its southern hemisphere near the South pole, formed as a result of a subcatastrophic collision. It orbits the Sun in the inner main-belt at a distance of 2.0–2.6 AU once every 3 years and 6 months (1,268 days; semi-major axis of 2.29 AU). Its orbit has an eccentricity of 0.12 and an inclination of 6° with respect to the ecliptic. The asteroid's observation arc begins in 1987, as no precoveries had been taken prior to its discovery.

Naming 

This minor planet was named in honor of Belgian painter and internationally prominent 20th century artist, Pierre Alechinsky (born 1927), known for his treatment of colors, versatility and graphic humor. He was a member of the expressionist art group and avant-garde movement CoBrA, a name which was coined from the initials of the members' home cities: Copenhagen, Brussels, and Amsterdam. The approved naming citation was published by the Minor Planet Center on 13 October 2000.

Physical characteristics

Diameter and albedo 

According to the survey carried out by the NEOWISE mission of NASA's space-based Wide-field Infrared Survey Explorer, Alechinsky measures 4.4 kilometers in diameter and its surface has an albedo of 0.194, while the Collaborative Asteroid Lightcurve Link assumes an albedo of 0.24 – which derives from 8 Flora, the largest member and namesake of this orbital family – and calculates a diameter of 3.9 kilometers with an absolute magnitude of 14.2.

Rotation period 

In February 2013, two rotational lightcurves of Alechinsky were obtained from photometric observations in the R-band by astronomers at the Palomar Transient Factory, California. Such an exceptionally high amplitude in magnitude indicates that the body has a very elongated shape.

References

External links 
 Asteroid Lightcurve Database (LCDB), query form (info )
 Dictionary of Minor Planet Names, Google books
 Discovery Circumstances: Numbered Minor Planets (10001)-(15000) – Minor Planet Center
 
 

014832
Discoveries by Eric Walter Elst
Named minor planets
19870827